Andrei Mikhalovich Sigaryov (born March 10, 1993) is a Russian professional ice hockey player. He is currently an unrestricted free agent who most recently played with HC Lada Togliatti of the Supreme Hockey League (VHL).

Sigaryov made his Kontinental Hockey League debut playing with SKA Saint Petersburg during the 2012–13 KHL season.

On May 5, 2017, following the completion of the 2016–17 season, Sigaryov was traded by Admiral Vladivostok to Sibir Novosibirsk in exchange for Vladimir Butuzov.

References

External links

1993 births
Living people
Admiral Vladivostok players
Dizel Penza players
HC Lada Togliatti players
HC Ryazan players
HC Sibir Novosibirsk players
HC Yugra players
Lokomotiv Yaroslavl players
Metallurg Novokuznetsk players
Russian ice hockey left wingers
Sibirskie Snaipery players
SKA-1946 players
SKA Saint Petersburg players
Sportspeople from Khabarovsk